Tim Bartro is a retired American soccer player whose career spanned leagues from the first North American Soccer League to the Continental Indoor Soccer League.

Playing History 
In 1982, Bartro graduated from Federal Way High School.  That year, the Seattle Sounders selected Bartro in the third round (thirty-third overall) of the North American Soccer League draft.  He spent his first season with the Sounders reserves, then made his first team debut in 1983.  The Sounders folded after the 1983 season and Bartro moved to the Golden Bay Earthquakes in time to play for them during the NASL indoor season.  Although he scored ten goals in seventeen games during the indoor season, Bartro saw time in only two regular seasons, outdoor games in 1984.  He left the Earthquakes that fall to sign with the Tacoma Stars of the Major Indoor Soccer League.  During the 1985-1986 MISL season, Tacoma sent Bartro to the San Diego Sockers.  The Sockers released Bartro at the end of the season, and he returned to Seattle to play for FC Seattle in the Western Soccer Alliance.  He was 1986 Second Team All League.  In December 1986, Bartro rejoined the Sockers as a free agent, playing for their reserve team until he earned a spot on their roster.  In the fall of 1987, Bartro moved to the Memphis Storm of the American Indoor Soccer Association.  In 1988, Barto signed with F.C. Seattle, now known as the F.C. Seattle Storm.   However, he may have played little or not at all.  In 1990, he played for the Portland Timbers in the American Professional Soccer League.  That year he also joined the Milwaukee Wave of the AISA.  In 1992, the AISA became the National Professional Soccer League and in October the Wave traded Bartro, Bill Andracki and Mark Kerlin to the Cleveland Crunch in exchange for David Vaudreuil.  He finished his professional career in 1995 and 1996 with the Seattle SeaDogs of the Continental Indoor Soccer League.

Coaching 

Tim Bartro has worked as a soccer coach for over 30 years coaching youth teams, camps, clinics and professionally and is the director of The Tacoma LIons Soccer Skills Academy and runs Tim Bartro Soccer Development. Previous coaching experience also includes Washington Premier Football Club and was the 2014 head coach of the Tacoma Galaxy of the Premier Arena Soccer League (PASL.)

External links
 Career stats
goal.wa

References

Living people
1964 births
Soccer players from Honolulu
American soccer players
American Indoor Soccer Association players
American Professional Soccer League players
Cleveland Crunch players
Continental Indoor Soccer League players
Major Indoor Soccer League (1978–1992) players
Memphis Storm players
Milwaukee Wave players
National Professional Soccer League (1984–2001) players
North American Soccer League (1968–1984) players
North American Soccer League (1968–1984) indoor players
Portland Timbers (1985–1990) players
San Jose Earthquakes (1974–1988) players
San Diego Sockers (original MISL) players
Seattle SeaDogs players
Seattle Storm (soccer) players
Tacoma Stars players
Western Soccer Alliance players
Seattle Sounders (1974–1983) players
Association football forwards